Ophis is Greek for "serpent", and may refer to:
 The constellation Serpens
 Ophis (Pontus), a town of ancient Pontus, now in Turkey
 Ophis (river), a river of ancient Anatolia
 Serpent (Bible), a figure in the Hebrew bible
 SS Ophis, a cargo ship built in 1919 and which was sunk in 1942 when named Empire Antelope
 Ophis (High School DxD), a character in the light novel series High School DxD

See also
Apep